Richa Sharma is the name of:
 Richa Sharma (singer) (born 1980), Indian film playback singer and devotional singer
 Richa Sharma (actress) (1963–1996), Indian Bollywood actress
 Reecha Sharma, Nepali actress